"Don't Throw Your Love on Me So Strong" is a blues song written and recorded by Albert King. The song was first released on Bobbin Records, but it became King's first hit record after its release on King Records in 1961.

Recording and release 
King recorded "Don't Throw Your Love on Me So Strong" in St. Louis with Ike Turner on piano. It was originally released on Little Milton's St. Louis-based label, Bobbin Records, in October 1961. When the record sold well locally, it was leased to King Records and reissued in November 1961. The song became Albert King's first hit single. It reached No. 14 on the Billboard R&B chart and No. 34 on the Cash Box R&B chart in December 1961.

The song appeared on King's debut album The Big Blues, released on King Records in 1962.

Chart performance

References 

1961 songs
1961 singles
Albert King songs
King Records (United States) singles